Forficula lurida is a species of earwig in the family Forficulidae. It is mostly found in the Palaearctic realm, as well as parts of the Afrotropical realm.

References 

Forficulidae
Insects of Asia
Insects of Europe
Insects described in 1853